St Patrick's Gaelic Football Club is a Gaelic Athletic Association club in southern County Armagh, Northern Ireland. It is part of the Armagh GAA, and is based in the townland and village of Cullyhanna.

The club plays Gaelic football in the Armagh Senior Championship, and the Senior and Junior All-County Leagues. It also fields ladies' Gaelic football and camogie teams.

History
Having reached its first Armagh Intermediate Football Championship final in 1971, the club moved for a time into the Senior ranks, reaching the semi-final in 1974. In 1979 St Patrick's won the IFC, defeating Mullaghbawn by 0-7 to 0-5. The same clubs met again in the 1988 IFC final, St Pat's winning by 2-9 to 1-5. Twenty years later St Pat's again won the IFC, defeating Cullaville by 13 points to 5. They beat Crossmaglen Rangers on 2 October 2016 to reach the Armagh Senior Championship final for the first time in their history.

The club acquired a 7-acre site on the  Tullynavall Road, outside Cullyhanna, for £15,500 in the 1980s. A new pitch opened in 1986. A social club has since been erected on the site, using voluntary labour.

Notable players
 Ciaran McKeever, Armagh U21 and Senior player, member of 2008, 2010 and 2011 Ireland international rules football teams

Honours
 Armagh Intermediate Football Championship (3)
 1979, 1988, 2008
 Armagh Senior Football Championship Runner-Up
 2013, 2016 
 Armagh Under-21 Football Championship (5 times):
 1992, 2011, 2013, 2014, 2015

References

External links
 St Patrick's GFC page on Armagh GAA website

Gaelic games clubs in County Armagh
Gaelic football clubs in County Armagh